Channon Thompson (born 29 March 1994) is a Trinidad and Tobago female volleyball player, playing as a s. She was part of the Trinidad and Tobago Women's National Volleyball Team.

She participated in the 2010 Women's Pan-American Volleyball Cup, and the 2011 Women's Pan-American Volleyball Cup.
On club level she played for AZS Białystok in 2011.

References

External links
https://web.archive.org/web/20170612120616/http://www.sportarchivestt.com/athletes/channon-andrea-thompson/
http://www.guardian.co.tt/sport/2013-06-03/channon-thompson-its-all-about-volleyball
http://www.scoresway.com/?sport=volleyball&page=player&id=5473
 

1994 births
Living people
Trinidad and Tobago women's volleyball players
Expatriate sportspeople in Turkey
Place of birth missing (living people)